McKell is a surname. Notable people with the surname include:

Iain McKell, English photographer
Michael McKell (born 1959), English actor and singer/songwriter
Mike McKell, American lawyer and politician
William McKell GCMG (1891–1985), Australian politician, Premier of New South Wales from 1941 to 1947, 12th Governor-General of Australia

See also
Electoral district of McKell, electoral district of the Legislative Assembly in the Australian state of New South Wales, created in 1988

de:McKell